Leucadendron salicifolium, the common stream conebush, is a flower-bearing shrub belonging to the genus Leucadendron and forms part of the fynbos. The plant is native to the Western Cape where it occurs from Porterville to Kogelberg and Langeberg.

Description
The plant dies after a fire but the seeds survive. The seeds are stored in a toll on the female plant and only fall to the ground after a fire and are possibly spread by the wind. The plant is unisexual and there are separate plants with male and female flowers, which are pollinated by the wind.

Distribution and habitat
In English, it is known as the common stream conebush. The tree's national number is 82.1.

Gallery

References

salicifolium
Taxa named by Richard Anthony Salisbury